Edward William Bradley II (October 16, 1927 – December 30, 2009) was an American football player who played at the guard position.

A native of Bridgeport, Connecticut, he played college football for the Wake Forest Demon Deacons. He was selected by the Chicago Bears in the 16th round (206th overall pick) of the 1950 NFL Draft. He played for the Bears during the 1950 and 1952 seasons and appeared in a total of 12 NFL games. His son Ed Bradley Jr. also played football for Wake Forest and in the NFL.

His son Ed Bradley III also played in the NFL, as a linebacker from 1972 to 1978.

References

1927 births
2009 deaths
Chicago Bears players
Wake Forest Demon Deacons football players
Players of American football from Connecticut